is the 13th studio album by Japanese idol duo Wink, released by Polystar on December 1, 1994. It features the single "Cherie Mon Cherie". Like the duo's previous release Overture! the album consists of completely original songs.

The album peaked at No. 58 on Oricon's albums chart and sold over 16,000 copies.

Track listing 
All music is arranged by Satoshi Kadokura.

Charts

References

External links 
 
 
 

1994 albums
Wink (duo) albums
Japanese-language albums